Uşak Sportif, also known as Uşak Üniversitesi Belediyespor, was a professional basketball team that is based in the city of Uşak, in Turkey. The team was founded in 2006. Their home arena was the Uşak Üniversitesi Sport Hall, which has a seating capacity of 2,000.

History
The basketball brand of Uşak Sportif was founded in 2006, after the club's football section had already been active since 1984. From 2006 to 2013, the team played in the (Turkish 2nd-tier level TB2L. In the 2012–13 season, Uşak finished 1st in the regular season, and was promoted to the Turkish top-tier level TBL (now called BSL) as the league's playoffs runner-up. In the 2013–14 season, the team made its debut in the Turkish highest level league, and immediately sealed a playoffs spot. This achievement led to the European-wide league debut of Uşak in the 2014–15 season, when it participated in the European-wide 3rd-tier level EuroChallenge. In April 2015, the team became known as "Muratbey Uşak Sportif", for name sponsorship reasons.

In the 2017–18 season, Uşak relegated to the second tier Turkish Basketball First League (TBL). In August 2018, the club announced it was shutting down for the next season, as the club was unable to pay off its past debts.

Season by season

Players

Notable players

 Alper Saruhan
 Erdinç Balto
 Gürol Karamahmut
 Rahim Rızvanoğlu
 Sertaç Şanlı
 Can Korkmaz
 Orhan Hacıyeva
 David Jelínek
 Miha Zupan
 Šarūnas Vasiliauskas
 Evaldas Kairys
 Chris Warren
 Khem Birch
 Paul Harris
 Courtney Fells
 Eli Holman
 Justin Carter

References

External links

Official Website 
Eurobasket.com Profile

Defunct basketball teams in Turkey
Turkish Basketball Super League teams
2006 establishments in Turkey
Basketball teams established in 2006
Sport in Uşak